Peter Polansky and Adil Shamasdin were the defending champions, but chose not to participate.

Carsten Ball and Brydan Klein won the title defeating Dean O'Brien and Ruan Roelofse in the final, 6–4, 7–6(7–4).

Seeds

Draw

References 
 Main Draw

2015 MD
Kentucky Bank Tennis Championships - Men's Doubles